Irmin may refer to:

 Irmin Schmidt (born 1937), German composer and founding member of the band Can
 A Germanic deity in some currents of Germanic neopaganism, especially in Irminism
 The son of Mannus, a figure in the creation myths of the Germanic tribes; possibly the same god as Odin

See also
 Erwin (disambiguation)
 Ermine (disambiguation)
 Irma (name)
 Irminsul
 Irwin (disambiguation)

Germanic given names